is a private university in Fukuoka, Fukuoka, Japan, established in 1973.

External links
 Official website 

Educational institutions established in 1973
Private universities and colleges in Japan
Universities and colleges in Fukuoka Prefecture
1973 establishments in Japan
Dental schools in Japan